Cocoa Beach Jr./Sr. High School (formerly Cocoa Beach High School) is a public junior/senior high school that is a part of the Brevard County Public School System with students in grades seven through twelfth located in Cocoa Beach, Florida. Founded in 1964 it is one of two high schools in Brevard county to offer the International Baccalaureate Diploma Programme. The school's mascot is the Minuteman and current principal is Dr. Mark Rendell.

Academic recognition
In 2006, the school ranked 46th on Newsweek's Top 1000 High Schools list. In 2008, U.S. News & World Report ranked the school "Best," only one of three so named in Brevard County. The school continues to rank in the top schools according to Newsweek.

In 2008, seven students were selected as National Merit Scholarship semifinalists, out of 28 total selections in the county.

Athletic awards 

 2007 Surfing Florida Champions
 2004 Boys Basketball state champions
 1988 Girls Basketball state champions
 1973 U.S. High Schools Team Championships in Chicago, Ill, Cocoa Beach placed 17th out of over 60 teams.

Other achievements 

 Runner-up in FIRST Robotics Competition FIRST Championship 2007 (Joint with Rockledge High School)
 JROTC Color Guard State Champions 2002
 1973 Florida State High School Team Chess Champions, Brevard County High School Team Chess Champions 1973 and 1972.
 2021 JROTC Raiders Men's Team State Runner-up
 2021 JROTC Raiders Women's Team State Champions

Notable alumni

 Richard Amman, former NFL player
 Brian Johnson (college baseball), 2009 graduate, All-American baseball player for the University of Florida Professional baseball player.
 Kelly Slater, professional surfer, 11-time world champion
Cullen Douglas, professional actor, nominated for two Emmys
Willam Belli, American actor, drag queen, and model

Footnotes

External links
Cocoa Beach High School Website

Brevard Public Schools
Cocoa Beach, Florida
Educational institutions established in 1964
High schools in Brevard County, Florida
Public high schools in Florida
1964 establishments in Florida